Chandan Mal Baid (1922-2010) was a leader of the Indian National Congress. A native of Rajasthan, he served as that state's finance minister. He was cremated on 21 February 2010, he was the MLA from Taranagar, Churu, Rajasthan later on his son Chandra Shekhar Baid also served as MLA of Taranagar, Churu, Rajasthan.

References

2010 deaths
Rajasthani politicians
People from Churu district
1922 births
State cabinet ministers of Rajasthan
Indian National Congress politicians from Rajasthan